Dakota Ridge Senior High School is a public school located in Littleton, Colorado, United States.

History
Dakota Ridge High School opened in August 1996.

Campus
Dakota Ridge operates as a closed campus for freshmen and an open campus for sophomores (as of 2020), juniors, and seniors.

It sits atop a hill on Coal Mine Avenue, overlooking The Meadows Golf Course to the south.

A new wing was added roughly ten years after its original opening.

Attendance zone
Areas within the school's attendance zone include: Ken Caryl CDP

Extracurricular activities 
The school's athletic teams, known as the Dakota Ridge Eagles, compete in CHSAA class 5A in the Jefferson County League. Teams are fielded in baseball, basketball, marching band, cheerleading, cross country, football, golf, ice hockey, lacrosse, poms, soccer, softball, swimming, tennis, track and field, volleyball, and wrestling.

In 2007, the men's cross-country team won the State Championship. The women won in the 2008 5A state championship.

The 2012-13 cheerleading squad also brought home the League Championship for both Varsity & JV and won the CHSAA 4A/5A Coed State Championship in December 2012. The cheer squad went on to the USA Nationals Cheerleading & Dance Competition in Anaheim, California placing third in the nation. The next season (2013-2014) the Co-Ed Cheer squad took the state title for the second time in a row.

Instrumental music and performance
Winter guard

The Dakota Ridge Winter Guard has competed in the Rocky Mountain Color Guard Association (RMCGA) as well as Winter Guard International (WGI),and has received two state championship titles as well as other medalist finishes in the RMCGA unit.

Percussion ensemble

The Dakota Ridge Percussion Ensemble won RMPA State Champions (gold medalists) in PSCO class in 2014, 2015, and 2016, as well as RMPA State Champions (gold medalists) in PSCA class in 2015.

In the 2016 season, the Percussion Ensemble attended the WGI 2016 world championships in Dayton Ohio, finishing as World Champions (gold medalists) in PSCO class.

Notable alumni

 Todd Dunivant - professional soccer player; Los Angeles Galaxy
 Steven Wilson - professional baseball player, San Diego Padres

References

External links
 

Educational institutions established in 1996
Public high schools in Colorado
Jefferson County Public Schools (Colorado)
Schools in Jefferson County, Colorado
International Baccalaureate schools in Colorado
1996 establishments in Colorado